Liu Zhi (Xiao'erjing: ,  ca. 1660 – ca. 1739), or Liu Chih, was a Chinese Sunni Hanafi-Maturidi scholar of the Qing dynasty, belonging to the Huiru (Muslim) school of Neoconfucian thought. He was the most prominent of the Han Kitab writers who attempted to explain Muslim thought in the Chinese intellectual climate for a Hui Chinese audience, by frequently borrowing terminologies from Buddhism, Taoism and most prominently Neoconfucianism and aligning them with Islamic concepts. He was from the city of Nanjing. His magnum opus, Tianfang Xingli or 'Nature and Principle in the Direction of Heaven', was considered the authoritative exposition of Islamic beliefs and has been republished twenty-five times between 1760 and 1939, and is often referred to by Muslims writing in Chinese.

Biography 
Liu Zhi was born into a scholarly family around 1660. In his childhood, he received instruction from his father, Liu Sanjie.  At the age of 12, he studied scriptures with Yuan Ruqi at the Garden of Military Studies Mosque in Nanjing, (which no longer exists). At the age of 15, he began a career of study in his home: for fifteen years, he studied Confucianism, Buddhism, Daoism and "Western Studies."  He considered Confucius and Mencius to be "Sages of the East" and Muhammad to be a "Sage of the West," and that "the teachings of the Sages of East and West, today as in ancient times, are one."  He further believed that the scriptures of Islam are also "generally similar to the intentions of Confucius and Mencius." From around the age of 30, he took up residence at the foot of Qingliangshan in Nanjing, where he began to interpret and expound on the Islamic scriptures, using Confucian studies, for a period of about twenty years.  During this time, he twice brought his manuscript with him to visit and solicit advice and the opinions of both Muslims and non-Muslims, leaving his tracks throughout Jiangsu, Shandong, Hebei, Henan, Anhui, Zhejiang, Guangdong, and other places.  In his later years, he resided at his studio, Saoyelou ("House of Sweeping Leaves"), at Qingliangshan in Nanjing.

He learned Arabic and Persian, and studied both Buddhism and Daoism. He also wrote several works on Islam in 1674, 1710, and 1721.

His writings became part of the Han Kitab, a collection of literature which synthesized Islam and Confucianism.

He said that Muslims were allowed to believe in the Mandate of Heaven and serve the Emperor, because Allah allowed the Mandate of Heaven to exist.

After Liu Zhi's death, his tomb became a site of pilgrimage for Chinese Muslims, with thousands visiting his tomb annually.

Works 
  (Tianfang Xingli, The Metaphysics of Islam or The Philosophy of Arabia) .  was the Arabic translation by Ma Lianyuan 1841-1903 (Muḥammad Nūr al-Ḥaqq ibn Luqmān as-Ṣīnī) (محمد نور الحق إبن لقمان الصيني)
  (Tianfang Dianli, The Rites of Islam) 
  (Arabic Script explanation meaning) 
  (Tianfang Zhisheng Shilu, The Real Record of the Last Prophet of Islam) In 1921 it was translated into English by Royal Asiatic Society member Isaac Mason as "The Arabian Prophet: A Life of Mohammad from Chinese Sources".

See also 
 Wang Daiyu, Chinese Islamic scholar, considered the first Han Kitab writer.
 Yusuf Ma Dexin, a later Chinese Islamic philosopher and reformist.
 Ma Zhu
 List of Hanafis
 List of Ash'aris and Maturidis
 List of Muslim theologians

References

External links

Downloadable works of Liu Zhi on archive.org
劉智 CDSIA

Hanafis
Maturidis
17th-century Muslim theologians
Shaykh al-Islāms
Sunni Sufis
Sunni imams
Sunni Muslim scholars of Islam
Hui people
Chinese Muslims
Writers from Nanjing
Chinese Confucianists
Qing dynasty writers
Chinese spiritual writers
17th-century Chinese writers
18th-century Chinese writers
18th-century Muslim theologians
1655 births
1660 births
1739 deaths
1745 deaths
18th-century Chinese translators